Peter "Piccolo Pete" Elko (June 17, 1918 – September 17, 1993) was a Major League Baseball third baseman who played with the Chicago Cubs in  and .

External links

1918 births
1993 deaths
Chicago Cubs players
Major League Baseball third basemen
Baseball players from Pennsylvania
Sportspeople from Wilkes-Barre, Pennsylvania
Nashville Vols players
Fulton Tigers players